Palm Beach may refer to:

Places

Australia
Palm Beach, New South Wales, a suburb of Sydney
Palm Beach, Queensland, on the Gold Coast

United States
Palm Beach, Florida
West Palm Beach, Florida
Palm Beach County, Florida
Palm Beach Hotel (Palm Beach, Florida)
Palm Beach International Airport
Palm Beach Opera
Palm Beach, Illinois
 Palm Beach, an artificial beach at Moody Gardens Resort, Galveston, Texas

Other countries
Palm Beach, Aruba
Palm Beach, Oro-Medonte, Ontario, Canada
Palm Beach, New Zealand, Waiheke Island, New Zealand
Palm Beach, KwaZulu-Natal, South Africa

Other uses
Palm Beach (1980 film), an Australian drama film
Palm Beach (2019 film), an Australian comedy-drama film

See also

Palm Beach Airport (disambiguation)
Palm Coast, Florida